Letícia Sobral (born 6 December 1980) is a former professional tennis player from Brazil.

Biography
Born in Rio de Janeiro, Sobral began competing on the ITF Circuit in the late 1990s and went on to win 25 doubles titles, the first in 2003.

With a best doubles ranking of 105 in the world, she featured in the main draw of several WTA Tour events from 2005 to 2007, all with regular partner María José Argeri.

In 2006, she appeared in four Fed Cup ties for Brazil, winning all three of her completed doubles matches.

Sobral is now based in São Paulo and works as a tennis coach.

ITF finals

Singles: 4 (1–3)

Doubles: 40 (25–15)

References

External links
 
 
 

1980 births
Living people
Brazilian female tennis players
Sportspeople from Rio de Janeiro (city)
20th-century Brazilian women
21st-century Brazilian women